Hornskrokens IF is a sports club in Boden, Sweden. It was established on 23 May 1933 and runs handball, earlier even bandy, soccer, orienteering and skiing. In 1983, the club played in the qualifying rounds for the Handball Allsvenskan.

The women’s soccer team played five seasons in the Swedish top division between 1978–1986.

References

External links
Official website 

1933 establishments in Sweden
Sport in Norrbotten County
Swedish handball clubs
Defunct football clubs in Sweden
Defunct bandy clubs in Sweden
Orienteering clubs in Sweden
Ski clubs in Sweden
Sports clubs established in 1933
Association football clubs established in 1933
Bandy clubs established in 1933
Multi-sport clubs in Sweden